The Rock The Cosmos Tour was the second and final concert tour by Queen + Paul Rodgers, promoting their only studio album The Cosmos Rocks. The opening date was recorded for a DVD release. which was released on 15 June 2009. The tour included one of the largest open-air concerts in Kharkiv, Ukraine which garnered 350,000 people. Over the course of the tour, they played to just short of one million viewers.

Set list
This set list is representative of the performance on 13 October 2008 in London. It does not represent all concerts for the duration of the tour.

"Hammer to Fall"
"Tie Your Mother Down"
"Fat Bottomed Girls"
"Another One Bites the Dust"
"I Want It All"
"I Want to Break Free"
"C-lebrity"
"Surfs Up... School's Out"
"Seagull"
"Love of My Life"
"'39"
"Bass solo" / "Drum solo"
"I'm in Love with My Car"
"A Kind of Magic"
"Say It's Not True"
"Bad Company"
"We Believe"
"Guitar Solo" / "Bijou" / "Last Horizon"
"Radio Ga Ga"
"Crazy Little Thing Called Love"
"The Show Must Go On"
"Bohemian Rhapsody"
Encore
"Cosmos Rockin'"
"All Right Now"
"We Will Rock You"
"We Are the Champions"

Tour dates

Box office score data

Tour band
Brian May – Lead guitar, Vocals
Roger Taylor – Drums, Tambourine, Vocals
Paul Rodgers – Lead vocals, Guitar, Piano, Harmonica
Freddie Mercury – Pre-recorded lead vocals

Additional musicians
Spike Edney – Synthesizer, Piano, Keytar, Accordion, Backing vocals
Danny Miranda – Bass guitar, Electric upright bass, Backing vocals
Jamie Moses – Rhythm guitar, Backing vocals, Electric upright bass on "Bass Solo" (Cardiff & Birmingham gigs only)
Neil Murray (replacing Danny Miranda in Cardiff & Birmingham) – Bass guitar, Electric upright bass on "'39"
 Al Murray was a guest at the first O2 gig and sang "Cosmos Rockin'" with Paul.
 Former Prime Minister of Latvia Ivars Godmanis was a guest in Riga playing the drums on "All Right Now", with Taylor on tambourine.

References 

Queen (band) concert tours
2008 concert tours
Queen + Paul Rodgers concert tours